Adriaan ("Adri") van Houwelingen (born 27 October 1953 in Heesselt, Gelderland) is a retired road bicycle racer from the Netherlands, who was a professional rider from 1978 to 1987. He won the 18th stage at the 1982 Tour de France and the 1983 Ronde van Nederland. He also competed in the team time trial event at the 1976 Summer Olympics.

His younger brother Jan was also a professional cyclist. He is now a directeur sportif with Team Rabobank.

See also 
 List of Dutch Olympic cyclists

References

External links 

This article incorporates information from the revision as of 5 May 2007 of the article Adri van Houwelingen on the Dutch Wikipedia.

1953 births
Living people
People from Neerijnen
Dutch male cyclists
Dutch Tour de France stage winners
Dutch Vuelta a España stage winners
Directeur sportifs
Olympic cyclists of the Netherlands
Cyclists at the 1976 Summer Olympics
Cyclists from Gelderland
20th-century Dutch people